The North Brisbane College of Advanced Education was an Australian higher education institution (College of Advanced Education) from 1975 to 1982.

It was formed on 20 February 1975 combining the existing Kedron Park Teachers College with a new campus at Carseldine.

It expanded beyond its original teaching remit to include courses in business studies, community studies and liberal studies.

It amalgamated with the Kelvin Grove College of Advanced Education, Mount Gravatt College of Advanced Education and the Brisbane Kindergarten Teachers College to from the multi-campus Brisbane College of Advanced Education with effect from 1 January 1982.

References

Defunct universities and colleges in Australia
Colleges of Advanced Education
Educational institutions established in 1972
Educational institutions disestablished in 1982
1975 establishments in Australia
1982 disestablishments in Australia